The English National Table Tennis Championships are run by the English Table Tennis Association. The first championships were held in 1960. Desmond Douglas has won the most singles titles with 11, whilst the leading woman is Jill Parker-Hammersley-Shirley with seven singles titles.

Senior Events

Junior Events

Multiple titles

References

External links 
English Table Tennis Association Website

Table tennis competitions in the United Kingdom
National championships in England